The Taylor Building is a historic commercial building at 304 Main Street in Little Rock, Arkansas.  It is a three-story masonry structure, built out of load-bearing brick with limestone trim.  Its facade has a commercial storefront on the ground floor, and three windows on the upper floors, articulated by two-story columns rising to limestone capitals and finely crafted Romanesque arches.  Built in 1897, it is a rare surviving example of 19th-century commercial architecture in the city.

The building was listed on the National Register of Historic Places in 1986.

See also
National Register of Historic Places listings in Little Rock, Arkansas

References

Commercial buildings on the National Register of Historic Places in Arkansas
Commercial buildings completed in 1900
Buildings and structures in Little Rock, Arkansas
National Register of Historic Places in Little Rock, Arkansas
Historic district contributing properties in Arkansas